Thaikulame Thaikulame is a 1995 Indian Tamil-language comedy drama film directed by N. Murugesh while the story was written by K. Bhagyaraj. The film stars Pandiarajan, Urvashi and Vinaya Prasad while Vadivelu, R. Sundarrajan starring in supporting roles. The film was released on 22 September 1995, and did well at the box office. The film was remade in Telugu as Intlo Illalu Vantintlo Priyuralu, in Hindi as Gharwali Baharwali and in Kannada as Naanu Nanna Hendthiru. Master Mahendran won the Tamil Nadu State Film Award for Best Child Artist.

Plot 

Pandiarajan and Urvashi have no children even after being married for a long time, the doctor informs Pandiarajan that his wife cannot bear children. Not willing to hurt his wife's feelings, he takes the blame on himself. His father (R. Sundarrajan) pesters him to get married for second time just to bear a child. While on a business tour to Nepal, he marries a Nepali girl (Vinaya) under some unavoidable circumstances. When he learns that she is carrying his child, Pandiarajan arranges for her stay at his friend's house. Vinaya delivers a boy and Pandiarajan adopts him with his wife's consent who is not aware of the truth. Unable to suppress her urge to be near her child, the Nepali girl comes as a cook to her husband's house. Pandiarajan's father learns the truth and tells his son to accept Vinaya and make a clean of things to Urvashi. But Pandiarajan who is apprehensive of his wife's reaction begs his father to keep the whole affair under wraps. The story takes a turn to climax when Urvashi, not happy with the goings on in the kitchen, tries to get Vinaya married off to someone else. The movie ends on a happy note when Urvashi comes to a compromise and the two wives live happily with one husband.

Cast 
Pandiarajan as Pandi
Urvashi as Janaki
Vinaya Prasad as Monisha
Vadivelu as Tamilpitthan
R. Sundarrajan
Mahendran

Soundtrack 
Soundtrack was composed by Deva and lyrics written by Vaali and Vairamuthu.

References

External links 
 

1990s Tamil-language films
1995 comedy-drama films
1995 films
Comedy of remarriage films
Films scored by Deva (composer)
Films set in Nepal
Films shot in Nepal
Films with screenplays by K. Bhagyaraj
Indian comedy-drama films
Polygamy in fiction
Tamil films remade in other languages